Silusa is a genus of beetles belonging to the family Staphylinidae.

The species of this genus are found in Europe and Northern America.

Species:
 Silusa africana (Cameron, 1930) 
 Silusa alternans Erichson, 1837

References

Staphylinidae
Staphylinidae genera